Akvaryumda Sessiz, Sakin, is a film by Tayfun Belet made in 2016. The international name is "Peace and Quiet in the Aquarium".

Synopsis
The film depicts the struggles of women who have married into the fisherman life. Some have not even seen the sea until they married and moved in with their husband. Hopes, dreams and fears of these fisherwomen who reside in Datça, Bozburun are explored in this documentary.

Awards
 BUZZ CEE - International Buzau Film Festival, Finalist. 2016
 International Balkan Film Food Festival, Official Selection. 2016
 SABC International Ekurhuleni Film Festival, Finalist. 2016
 International Baikal Film Festivali, Official Selection. 2016
 International One Country One Film Festival, Official Selection. 2016

References

External links

2016 films
Films set in Turkey
2010s Turkish-language films
Turkish short documentary films
2016 short documentary films